Greg or Gregory Boyd may refer to:
Greg Boyd (theologian) (born 1957), American theologian, pastor and author
S. Gregory Boyd, American author, attorney and professor
Greg Boyd (American football) (born 1952), American football player

See also 
 Greg Boyed (1970–2018), New Zealand journalist and television presenter